The tooth-billed wren (Odontorchilus cinereus) is a species of bird in the family Troglodytidae. It is found in Bolivia and Brazil.

Taxonomy and systematics

The tooth-billed wren shares its genus with one other species, the grey-mantled wren (Odontorchilus branickii). Some authors have suggested that they are conspecific or that they form a superspecies. The tooth-billed wren is monotypic.

Description

Adults have a grayish cinnamon crown, a grayish brown face, and a medium gray back. their throat and breast are buffy gray, the belly pale buff, and the flanks grayish white. The juvenile looks essentially the same.

Distribution and habitat

The tooth-billed wren is found mostly in Brazil but its range extends slightly into Bolivia's Santa Cruz Department. It is found south of the Amazon River between the Madeira River on the west and the Xingú River on the east.

Behavior

Feeding

The tooth-billed wren's diet is not known in detail, but the species is insectivorous. It usually is part of a mixed-species foraging flock.

Breeding

The tooth-billed wren's breeding season appears to span from June to September based on dates when active nests, dependent juveniles, and physiological evidence have been observed. It nests in a cavity in a limb or trunk high above the ground. The clutch size is believed to be two.

Vocalization

The tooth-billed wren's typical song is "a short, simple trill" ; both sexes sing it.

Status

The IUCN has assessed the tooth-billed wren to be of Least Concern. The species' population has not been quantified and is "suspected to decline by a rate approaching 30% over three generations.'

References

tooth-billed wren
Birds of the Amazon Basin
tooth-billed wren
Taxonomy articles created by Polbot